Khingz is a rapper from Seattle, Washington. He was named Best MC Of The Year by Seattle Weekly readers in 2009 after the Juneteenth release of his most recent full-length album, From Slaveships To Spaceships; critics at The Stranger, SoundNW Magazine, and Seattle Weekly described the album "royally awesome," "deeply revelatory, transformative," and "one of the boldest and most soul-baring albums [of 2009]." The emcee, now known for his socially conscious and politically liberal lyrics, was heavily involved in a gang between the ages of 10 and 20; he told Seattle Weekly that period of his life "shaped who he is now" and that "certain tell-all scars from those days linger."

Khingz gained a reputation as a skilled battle emcee in the early 2000s. From 2001 to 2008, the emcee performed and released music as part of hip-hop group Abyssinian Creole with Gabriel Teodros. Khingz is also a member of Seattle-based hip-hop supergroup Good Medicine (with Geologic of Blue Scholars, Gabriel Teodros, and Macklemore), the trio Hi-Life Soundsystem (with B-Flat and Crispy of Godspeed), and The Livin Yard (with Gabriel Teodros and Nam). His first solo album, Mi Vida Negra, was released under the name Khalil Crisis in 2001; Khingz also released an album entitled Daze Like This with Maroon Colony in 1999, under the emcee name Krisys.

Khingz maintains an active blog on Blogspot called Flying Dragon Punch.

Discography 
 Solo
 2001: Mi Vida Negra, Khalil Crisis [LP]
 2007: Khingz County Vol. 1 Mxtape
 2009: From Slaveships To Spaceships [LP], Fresh Chopped Beats/MADK Productions
 2009: Cold-Hearted In Cloud City [EP]
 2008: The Khingz Bigger Than Jeezuz Mxtape
 2011: Liberation of the Monster, Wandering Worx
 Abyssinian Creole
 2005: Sexy Beast [LP], Pangea/MADK Productions
 2005: Sexy Beast [EP], Pangea/MADK Productions
 The Livin Yard
 2009: Summer's Here/Society Of Summer Mxtape, Fresh Chopped Beats/MADK Productions
 The Building Project
 2009: Moving Pictures [LP], Fresh Chopped Beats/MADK Productions
 Appearances
 2007: Lovework [LP] by Gabriel Teodros, Massline
 Hi-Life Soundsystem
 2010: Self-Titled [LP], Members Only

References

External links
Khingz on Wandering Worx
Flying Dragon Punch on Blogspot
Khingz on Myspace
Khingz on Twitter

Living people
American hip hop musicians
Musicians from Seattle
Year of birth missing (living people)
Rappers from Washington (state)
21st-century American rappers
West Coast hip hop musicians